is the Japanese term for picture books. It may be applied in the general sense, or may refer specifically to a type of woodblock printed illustrated volume published in the Edo period (1603–1867).

The first  were religious items with images by Buddhist painters. In the early modern period (1600–1868) illustrated books exploded in popularity. They covered a diverse range of subjects with experimentation in production techniques.

 production was a significant part of the Japanese publishing industry (particularly) during the 19th century; most Japanese woodblock print artists of the period produced  designs (often in large quantities), as commercial work.

Toward the end of the 19th century,  chapter-books were eclipsed in popularity by the new "Western" concept of literary magazines. These were larger books which contained more, and a wider range of material per-issue, but usually fewer pictures (measured on a text-to-images ratio). They often used more modern printing methods; the increase in production costs was offset by increased efficiency, larger-scale printing and distribution, and the introduction of advertising. Typically, a magazine would include one large folded, polychrome illustration referencing some "feature" story in the volume, as a frontispiece. The new format also absorbed most of the remaining talent and market for ukiyo-e style prints.

Notable 

Artist manuals or model books were treasured by art schools and became popular with the public. Ōoka Shunboku's  ('Hand mirror') of 1720 demonstrated characteristic styles of different artists. Illustrations which were either handpainted or stenciled appear in his  of 1746, based on the successful Chinese Manual of the Mustard Seed Garden of 1679 which was released as a Japanese version, in 1748.

In 1765 polychrome woodblock printing was developed in Edo. The prints were called , 'brocade pictures', because of their similarity to color silk brocades. The book featured realistic depictions of kabuki actors and was popular with theatergoers. It depicted craftsmen at work at was immediately successful.

In 1790 the Tokugawa shogunate introduced severe censorship laws for publishers. They targeted "luxurious" works and for a while publishers ceased production of color woodblock-printed books.

The famous ukiyo-e artist Hokusai worked on dozens of  early in his career. In 1814 the first volume of his  was published which featured hundreds of drawings colored with gray and rose pink tones. Its popularity with multiple subsequent volumes appears to have influenced other publishers to use a simplified palette of subdued color. One of the finest ehon works is his 100 Views of Mount Fuji released in 1834–1835 in two volumes by Nishimuraya Yohachi with extremely fine carving by the workshop of Egawa Tomekichi and exquisite grey gradations. It is seen as the pinnacle of monochrome printing.

The term is believed to emanate from illustrators who came from major Buddhist temples in and around the Nara region, such as Tōdai-ji and Kōfuku-ji or the Kasuga-taisha. The manuscripts are decorated with ink, colour pigments, gold, as well as silver-decorated endleaves. When the amount of commissions from the nobility at these temples declined, the artists left for Kyoto to set up studios and took orders for work, similar to local painters.

Manufacture

Most  of the Edo period were made with side-stitched binding. They used highly durable washi paper. A page is made from a single sheet printed on one side which is folded printed side out. These folded sheets are bound at their open ends with cords of twisted paper which go through two holes made in the stack of sheets. The bookcover is glued to blank outer pages and attached to the stack of pages with a hemp cord stitched through four holes which penetrate the covers and book block. This method of binding is called .

See also
 Japanese books

References

External links

The World of the Japanese Illustrated Book The Gerhard Pulverer Collection
Ehon: the artist and the book in Japan New York Public Library

Ukiyo-e genres
Japanese books
Japanese art